Project Runway All Stars (Season 2) is the second season of the Project Runway spin-off series Project Runway All Stars. It featured 13 designers from seasons 1-9 of the original series with a new host, Carolyn Murphy. The judges, Georgina Chapman and Isaac Mizrahi as well as mentor, Joanna Coles, returned. The season premiered on Lifetime on October 25, 2012.

Guest judges include Kylie Minogue, Katie Holmes, Stacy Keibler, Liv Tyler, and Gretchen Mol as well as renowned fashion designers Diane von Fürstenberg, Jason Wu, Margherita Missoni, Charlotte Ronson, Rafe Totengco, and Elie Tahari, in addition to fashion blogger Tavi Gevinson. Cameo appearances included Karl Lagerfeld and the House of Valentino.

The winner of this season was given the privilege of designing a custom-branded capsule collection for Nine West, receive $150,000 in cash, a sewing and embroidery studio provided by Brother Sewing and Embroidery, an all-expenses paid trip around the world to attend fashion weeks in famous cities such as Paris, Milan, London, and Tokyo, courtesy of Laura Mercier, a technology suite provided by HP and Intel, a fashion spread in Marie Claire magazine, and a position with the publication of the aforementioned magazine as Contributing Editor for one year.

Judges 
American model and actress Carolyn Murphy serves as the host as well as a judge. Designers Isaac Mizrahi and Georgina Chapman also judge the returning designers. Marie Claire editor-in-chief Joanna Coles will mentor the veteran designers.

Designers
Names and locales per official site:

Designer Progress

 The designer won Project Runway All Stars Season 2.
 The designer won the challenge.
 The designer came in second but did not win the challenge.
 The designer had one of the highest scores for the challenge but did not win.
 The designer had one of the lowest scores for the challenge but was not eliminated.
 The designer was in the bottom two but was not eliminated.
 The designer lost the challenge and was eliminated from the competition.

Models
Kelly Jesionowski
Aminat Ayinde
Tsubasa Watanabe
Elyce Cole
Jenn Kosinski
Kiara Ridgell
Sam Taylor
Marleis Pfeifhofer
Elena Greenwell
Katya Tolstova
Ashley Johnson
Scarlett Shoeffling
Brittany Mason
Kelley Lynch

Rate The Runway Results
{| class="wikitable" style="text-align:center"
|+Designer Elimination Table
! Designer || 1 || 2 || 3 || 4 || 5 || 6 || 7 || 8 || 9 || 10 || 11 || 12 
|-
! Anthony Ryan
| style="background:cornflowerblue;"| WIN || IN || style="background:lightblue;"| HIGH || style="background:cornflowerblue;"| WIN || style="background:cornflowerblue;"| WIN || IN || style="background:turquoise;"| HIGH || style="background:turquoise;"| HIGH || style="background:pink;"| LOW || style="background:orange;"| LOW || style="background:cornflowerblue;"| WIN || style="background:limegreen;"| WINNER 
|-
! Emilio
| IN || IN || style="background:cornflowerblue;"| WIN || IN || style="background:lightblue;"| HIGH || style="background:lightblue;"| HIGH || style="background:lightblue;"| HIGH || style="background:lightblue;"| HIGH || style="background:orange;"| LOW || style="background:tomato;"| OUT || style="background:turquoise;"| HIGH || style="background:tomato;"| 3RD PLACE 
|-
! Uli
| style="background:turquoise;"| HIGH || style="background:cornflowerblue;"| WIN || IN || style="background:lightblue;"| HIGH || style="background:turquoise;"| HIGH || style="background:cornflowerblue;"| WIN || style="background:cornflowerblue;"| WIN || style="background:cornflowerblue;"| WIN || style="background:cornflowerblue;"| WIN || style="background:turquoise;"| HIGH || style="background:orange;"| LOW || style="background:tomato;"| RUNNER-UP 
|-
! Joshua
| IN || IN || IN|| style="background:pink;"| LOW || IN||IN|| style="background:pink;"| LOW || style="background:pink;"| LOW || style="background:pink;"| LOW ||style="background:cornflowerblue;"| WIN || style="background:tomato;"| OUT|| style="background:darkgray;" colspan="1"|
|-
! Ivy
| style="background:lightblue;"| HIGH || style="background:lightblue;"| HIGH || style="background:lightblue;"| HIGH || IN || IN || style="background:pink;"| LOW || style="background:pink;"| LOW ||  style="background:pink;"| LOW ||  style="background:tomato;"| OUT || style="background:darkgray;" colspan="3"|
|-
! Laura Kathleen
| IN|| IN || style="background:pink;"| LOW || IN || style="background:lightblue;"| HIGH || style="background:pink;"| LOW || style="background:cornflowerblue;"| WIN || style="background:tomato;"| OUT || style="background:darkgray;" colspan="4"|
|-
! Casanova
| style="background:lightblue;"| HIGH || style="background:lightblue;"| HIGH || IN || IN || style="background:pink;"| LOW || IN|| style="background:tomato;"| OUT || style="background:darkgray;" colspan="5"|
|-
! Althea
| IN || IN || IN || style="background:pink;"| LOW || IN||  style="background:tomato;"| OUT ||  style="background:darkgray;" colspan="6"|
|-
! Kayne
| IN || style="background:pink;"| LOW || style="background:pink;"| LOW || IN || style="background:tomato;"| OUT ||  style="background:darkgray;" colspan="7"|
|-
! Andrae
| style="background:pink;"| LOW || style="background:pink;"| LOW||IN ||style="background:tomato;"| OUT ||  style="background:darkgray;" colspan="8"|
|-
! Suede
| style="background:pink;"| LOW || style="background:pink;"| LOW|| style="background:tomato;"| OUT || style="background:darkgray;" colspan="9"|
|-
! Wendy
| IN || style="background:tomato;"| OUT || style="background:darkgray;" colspan="10"|
|-
! Peach
| style="background:tomato;"| OUT || style="background:darkgray;" colspan="11"|
|}

 Episodes

 Episode 1: Redemption on the Runway
Original airdate: October 25, 2012

The designers are split into two teams, and are tasked with creating collections inspired by a word selected from a board; one team chooses "Confident" as their inspiration, while the other team chooses "Bold."  Team "Confident" wins the challenge, which means that the loser will be from Team "Bold."  Laura Kathleen, a member of Team "Bold", is told that she had the strongest design on the losing team, and had Team "Bold" beaten Team "Confident" she might have been the winner of the challenge.Guest Judges: Rachel Roy & Mondo Guerra

WINNER: Anthony RyanELIMINATED: Peach Episode 2: Put On Your Dancing Shoes
Original airdate: November 1, 2012

The designers arrive at the Nine West showroom in Manhattan, where they each are given the opportunity to select a shoe from the upcoming collection to serve as their aesthetic starting point for the challenge, which is revealed to be creating a glamorous look for a night out on the town, inspired by the concept of "Disco".Guest Judge: Rafe Totengco

WINNER: UliELIMINATED: Wendy Episode 3: Up Your Aerosol
Original airdate: November 8, 2012

The designers are challenged to create "wearable art" using graffiti art as an inspiration. They are given a chance to create their own print with crate of spray paint, and 7 yards of a choice of cotton or chiffon fabric.Guest Judges: Jeffrey Costello & Robert Tagliapietra

WINNER: EmilioELIMINATED: Suede Episode 4: Made in the USA Today
Original airdate: November 15, 2012

With the first ever interactive challenge, the designers are instructed to choose a picture submitted via Twitter by a Project Runway fan as inspiration for a dress. Many viewers came from all different places of the world. The winning designer & look would be featured in an editorial issue of USA Today.Guest Judges: Tavi Gevinson & Charlotte Ronson

WINNER: Anthony RyanELIMINATED: Andrae Episode 5: You've Got Male
Original airdate: November 29, 2012

The designers are instructed to create an avant-garde androgynous look for their models. The day after, they are surprised with male models and are given an extra day to create a second look for the male model. The judges compare the looks side by side as they walk down the Runway together.Guest Judges: Jason Wu & Robert Rodriguez

WINNER: EmilioELIMINATED: Kayne Episode 6: Green Dress for the Red Carpet
Original airdate: December 6, 2012

The designers are brought to "The High Line" and are given the task to create an evening gown using Green Fabrics with prints or solid colors that were given to them. After selecting their fabrics, the designers are then allowed to use extra accessories or trimmings that were used by the designers in past challenges. The winning design is to be worn by Carolyn Murphy at a Red Carpet event.Guest Judge: Diane von Fürstenberg

WINNER: Laura KathleenELIMINATED: Althea Episode 7: An Unconventional Nightmare before Christmas
Original airdate: December 13, 2012

The seven still-standing designers take on an unconventional challenge of creating a look from items found in a Christmas novelty store, with the added twist that the dress cannot look like something inspired by or relating to Christmas.Guest Judges: Kylie Minogue & La La Anthony

WINNER: UliELIMINATED: Casanova Episode 8: Flapper Fashion Face-Off
Original airdate: December 20, 2012

The six remaining designers are challenged in a "Fashion Face Off" to design an outfit modernizing the Roaring 20's. The designers go head to head against each other in teams of two.

Winning Designers in bold.

Note: Although Emilio's design was named the winning design of his and Joshua's challenge, the judges also considered Joshua's work very good, and therefore didn't consider him for elimination. Conversely, although Emilio had the high score between him and Joshua, his design wasn't considered quite as good as Anthony Ryan's or Uli's, and the judges agreed during their deliberation that he was not the winner. Ivy makes history in Project Runway by surviving three consecutive Bottom Two appearances.Guest Judges: Gretchen Mol & Jenny Packham

WINNER: Anthony RyanELIMINATED: Laura Kathleen Episode 9: There's No Business Like Sew Business
Original airdate: December 27, 2012

The five remaining All Stars must create a ready to wear look while also meeting a retail budget of $500–$700. The winning design would be displayed in the store windows of Elie Tahari & manufactured and sold, with profits going to Save the Garment Center.Guest Judges: Elie Tahari & Stacy Keibler

WINNER: Anthony RyanELIMINATED: Ivy Episode 10: All Stars and Stripes
Original airdate: January 3, 2013

The Project Runway designers pay their tribute to the armed forces! The four remaining designers are paired with four female veterans from an array of different military branches. The designers will have to battle it out to see who can create a design that best suits each veteran for each of the special events they are attending.Guest Judges: Katie Holmes & Carmen Marc Valvo

WINNER: JoshuaELIMINATED: None Episode 11: Couture de France
Original airdate: January 10, 2013

The designers go international! For the first time ever in Project Runway history, the designers retire sketching at 1407 for a day of sketching in Paris at the Eiffel tower! The designers also get a once-in-a-lifetime opportunity to tour the Valentino atelier and showrooms, and are also invited to a private preview of Valentino's Couture show by creative directors Maria Grazia Chiuri and Pier Paolo Piccioli. With all of their newly acquired Parisian knowledge, the designers return to NYC to design a couture gown of their own that will hopefully secure their spot in the finale!Guest Judge: Cynthia Rowley

WINNER: Anthony RyanELIMINATED: Joshua Episode 12: Finale: Go Big Or Go Home
Original airdate: January 17, 2013

The three remaining designers compete in the final for a chance to win a life-altering grand prize! However, because this is All Stars, the final three designers only get four days and an hour and a half at Mood, to complete a full mini collection. With the help of previously eliminated designers, the final three duke it out and give it all they've got to prove who Project Runway's true All Star is.Guest Judges: Liv Tyler & Margherita Missoni

WINNER: Anthony RyanELIMINATED: Emilio & Uli'''

References

External links 

All Stars Season 02
2012 American television seasons
2012 in fashion
2012 in American television
2013 American television seasons
2013 in fashion
2013 in American television